Denis Rey (born 9 February 1966 in La Tronche, Isère, France) is a retired French alpine skier who competed in the 1992 Winter Olympics, finishing 27th in the men's downhill.

External links
 sports-reference.com
 

1966 births
Living people
French male alpine skiers
Olympic alpine skiers of France
Alpine skiers at the 1992 Winter Olympics
Sportspeople from La Tronche
20th-century French people